This is a list of gliders/sailplanes of the world, (this reference lists all gliders with references, where available) 
Note: Any aircraft can glide for a short time, but gliders are designed to glide for longer.

U

Unknown gliders
 U 2934 Ultra-light biplane
 U 3426 German glider
 U 3428 German glider
 U 3430 USA glider
 U 3873  Glider
 U 3971 Tandem glider
 U 3975 German glider biplane
 Bacerka (glider) only info is a photo at

US Aviation
 US Aviation Cloud Dancer
 US Aviation Cumulus
 US Aviation Super Floater

Urban Air
Urban Air UFM-13 Lambada

Ursinus
(Oskar Ursinus)
 Ursinus 1925 man-powered ornithopter

URMV-3 
(Uzinele de Reparatii Material Volant-3 – Braşov) c.f. ILL and ICA-Brasov
 URMV-3 IS-2 – Iosif Şilimon
 URMV-3 IS-3 – Iosif Şilimon

Uszacki
(Antoni Uszacki)
 Uszacki KLS-I Młodego Lotnika

UTVA
 UTVA MJ-1 – Mitrovich
 UTVA Orao 1 – Mitrovich
 UTVA Komar – utility (designed in Poland);
 UTVA Jastreb–utility (designed in Poland)
 UTVA Orlik – utility
 UTVA Ždral – utility (designed in Germany)
 UTVA Vaja–utility (designed in Germany)
 UTVA Čavka
 UTVA Jastreb
 UTVA Seva
 UTVA Soko
 UTVA Vrabac A
 UTVA Vrabac B

Notes

Further reading

External links

Lists of glider aircraft